Martín Raimundo Ojeda (born 27 May 1997) is an Argentine professional footballer who plays as a midfielder for Primera B Nacional side Boca Unidos.

Career
Ojeda was promoted into Boca Unidos' first-team squad in 2016, making his debut for the Primera B Nacional side during a 1–0 defeat to Villa Dálmine on 14 December. He made three more appearances in the 2016–17 campaign as Boca Unidos finished 20th.

Career statistics
.

References

External links

1997 births
Living people
People from Corrientes
Argentine footballers
Association football midfielders
Primera Nacional players
Boca Unidos footballers
Sportspeople from Corrientes Province